Anton Gogiashvili (24 December 1878 — 28 December 1907) was a Georgian painter. He is known for his portraits that showcase the life of the Georgian people, which were published in Georgian newspapers like Kvali. They are now housed in the Art Museum of Georgia.

References

External links
 Biography at the Bibliographical Dictionary of Georgia 

1878 births
1907 deaths
20th-century painters from Georgia (country)
People from Guria
Painters from the Russian Empire